Sulbi may refer to several places in Estonia:
Sulbi, Setomaa Parish, village in Võru County, Estonia
Sulbi, Võru Parish, village in Võru County, Estonia